Chopratown is a 2005 comedy drama from the BBC about private eye Vic Chopra (Sanjeev Bhaskar). In the film Chopra investigates Ali Ergun (Omid Djalili), a shady Turkish bakery owner. During his investigation he falls foul of Asian wide boy Ash Desai (Manish Patel) and added to this is the mystery of a missing cow.

Chopratown was directed by Sean Grundy, who also directed the first series of the Channel 4 drama Sugar Rush. The name "Chopratown" is a pun on the Jack Nicholson cult film Chinatown.

On release on 19 December 2005, the program had 4.1 million viewers.

References

External links 
 

2005 television films
2005 films
BBC television comedy
British television films
2000s English-language films